The American Institute of Instruction was formed in 1830.  The original purpose was to secure a Massachusetts Superintendent of Common Schools. Due to the work of Samuel Read Hall, George B. Emerson and E. A. Andrews, legislation was passed leading to both the appointment of Horace Mann as Secretary of the State Board of Education, and the Acts of 1837, providing for a Superintendent of Public Education.

References

Educational institutions established in 1830
Schools in Massachusetts
1830 establishments in Massachusetts